Dawit Fikadu Admasu (born 29 December 1995) is a Bahraini long-distance runner. Originally from Ethiopia, he obtained Bahraini citizenship in 2017. He won the Saint Silvester Road Race in 2014 and 2017 and the Okpekpe Road Race in 2019. He also won the 10,000 metres at the 2019 Asian Athletics Championships.

Personal bests
Outdoor
5000 metres – 13:10.40 (Lausanne 2019)
10,000 metres – 28:26.30 (Doha 2019)

Road
10 km – 27:56 (Casablanca 2016)
15 km – 43:53 (Mersin 2016)
Half marathon – 1:00:01 (Manama 2019)

References

1995 births
Living people
Bahraini male long-distance runners
Ethiopian male long-distance runners
World Athletics Championships athletes for Bahrain
Asian Athletics Championships winners
Olympic athletes of Bahrain
Athletes (track and field) at the 2020 Summer Olympics
20th-century Ethiopian people
21st-century Ethiopian people
21st-century Bahraini people